MHSAA can refer to:
Michigan High School Athletic Association
Mississippi High School Activities Association
Missouri High School Athletic Association